Maricel is a masculine or feminine given name. According to Meaning Names, its biblical definition means "He who raises" in Hebrew. 
Also, the hispanic name is a compound of María and Celia. The name is similar to Marisol.

Notable people with the name include:

 Maricel Laxa (born 1970), Filipina comedian and actress
 Maricel Presilla (living), American chef, culinary historian and author
 Maricel Soriano (born 1965), Filipina film and television actress
 Maricel Voinea (born 1959), Romanian team handball player and coach

See also
 Maricel Museum, a museum located in the centre of Sitges, Catalonia, Spain

Feminine given names